Pedro Joel Ciriaco Leguisamon (born September 27, 1985) is a Dominican former professional baseball infielder. He played in Major League Baseball (MLB) primarily for the Pittsburgh Pirates, Boston Red Sox, San Diego Padres, Kansas City Royals, and Atlanta Braves and has also had brief stints in the Texas Rangers, Miami Marlins, and Detroit Tigers organizations. Ciriaco has primarily played shortstop and third base throughout his career, but has appeared at every position except for pitcher and catcher.

Professional career

Arizona Diamondbacks
Ciriaco was signed by the Arizona Diamondbacks as an amateur free agent in 2003.

In 2005, Ciriaco played for the Diamondbacks' advanced rookie team, the Missoula Osprey. He then played for the team's A affiliate, the South Bend Silver Hawks in 2006. He spent the next two seasons with the Advance A class Visalia Oaks, gaining a promotion to Double-A Mobile Bay Bears in 2009. Ciriaco then began 2010 with Triple-A Reno Aces. At the beginning of the season, Baseball America ranked Ciriaco as the infielder with the best arm in the Diamondbacks' minor league system.

Pittsburgh Pirates
On July 30, 2010, Ciriaco and Chris Snyder were traded to the Pittsburgh Pirates in exchange for D. J. Carrasco, Ryan Church and Bobby Crosby. He was assigned to the Pirates' AAA club, the Indianapolis Indians. Ciriaco was a late season call-up for the Pirates and made his major league debut on September 8, 2010. He hit an RBI double in his first Major League at-bat, off Cristhian Martínez of the Atlanta Braves. He would play in eight games for Pittsburgh that season.

During the team's 2011 spring training, Ciriaco posted a .333 batting average while playing in a team-high 26 games. On March 27, 2011, he returned to Indianapolis after the Pirates named Rule 5 selection Josh Rodriguez to the team's Opening Day roster. The announcement came moments after Ciriaco and Rodriguez helped the Pirates defeat the Tampa Bay Rays by scoring on a throwing error in the bottom of the ninth inning to give the team a 5–4 victory.

In Indianapolis, Ciriaco played at second, third, shortstop and center field. He was non-tendered by the Pirates in mid-December after appearing in only 23 major league games in 2011.

Boston Red Sox
On January 3, 2012, the Boston Red Sox signed Ciriaco to a minor league contract. He attended spring training as a non-roster invitee, and led the Red Sox in batting average (.412), runs (14), hits (18), stolen bases (8), and games played (26), while collecting a .444 on-base percentage and a slugging of .651. He then was assigned to Triple-A Pawtucket. The Red Sox purchased his contract on July 6.

In 64 games with the Pawtucket Red Sox, Ciriaco hit for a .301 average, including four home runs and 21 RBIs.

The next day, Ciriaco made his Red Sox debut in the first game of a day-night doubleheader against the New York Yankees, getting the start at second. In the second game of the doubleheader, broadcasters Joe Buck and Tim McCarver named him the Player of the Game and praised Ciriaco for having a great glove at shortstop while providing some timely hits and speed on the basepaths. Ciriaco finished the game with four hits and 4 RBIs.

Also seeing time at second base and third, the three outfield positions and  designated hitter, Ciriaco batted .293 with 16 stolen bases in 76 games for the Boston Red Sox in 2012.  On June 10, 2013, Ciriaco was designated for assignment to make room for Will Middlebrooks.

San Diego Padres
On June 14, 2013, Ciriaco was traded from the Boston Red Sox to the San Diego Padres for a player to be named later. Ciriaco was acquired after second baseman Jedd Gyorko went on the disabled list with a groin strain, but he saw most of his action at shortstop, as Everth Cabrera went down with a hamstring injury soon after.  He hit .238/.284/.333 with 6 SB and 4 RBI in 23 games with the Padres before being designated for assignment on July 12 when Gyorko returned.

Kansas City Royals
On July 16, 2013, Ciriaco was claimed off waivers by the Kansas City Royals. He was designated for assignment on April 5, 2014. He was eventually called back up to the roster and was again designated for assignment on June 30, 2014. On July 6, he was outrighted to the Omaha Storm Chasers. Ciriaco elected free agency on September 29.

Atlanta Braves
On October 13, 2014, Ciriaco signed a minor league contract with the Atlanta Braves organization. On May 2, 2015, Ciriaco was selected to the active roster. After hitting a double and a triple in two of his first three at-bats in 2015, Ciriaco briefly led the major leagues in wRC+.

Texas Rangers
On January 13, 2016, Ciriaco signed a minor league contract with the Texas Rangers organization that included an invitation to Spring Training. In 17 spring games, he had a batting average of .487 along with an on-base percentage of 1.013.

Miami Marlins
On July 8, 2016, the Ciriaco was traded to the Miami Marlins in exchange for Eric Jokisch. On August 12, 2016, Ciriaco was released by the Marlins.

Detroit Tigers
On August 17, 2016, Ciriaco signed a minor league contract with the Detroit Tigers organization. On November 7, 2016, Ciriaco elected free agency.

Tigres de Quintana Roo
On May 5, 2017, Ciriaco signed with the Tigres de Quintana Roo of the Mexican Baseball League. He was released on July 6, 2017.

Vaqueros Unión Laguna
On July 11, 2017, Ciriaco signed with the Vaqueros Unión Laguna of the Mexican Baseball League. He was released on February 1, 2018.

Kagawa Olive Guyners
On April 28, 2018, he signed a contract with the Kagawa Olive Guyners of the Shikoku Island League Plus.

Awards and honors
 2012 –  Triple-A All-Star Game selection 
 2011 – Named the best defensive infielder in the Pittsburgh Pirates Minor League system by Baseball America
 2010 – All-Star Futures Game selection
 2009
 Named by Baseball America as the best defensive shortstop in the Southern League
 SOU Post-Season All-Star
 SOU Mid-Season All-Star
 2008
 CAL Post-Season All-Star
 CAL Mid-Season All-Star
 2006 – MIDW Mid-Season All-Star

Personal life
His younger brother, Audy, played in Minor League Baseball.

References

External links

1985 births
Living people
Atlanta Braves players
Boston Red Sox players
Dominican Republic expatriate baseball players in Mexico
Dominican Republic expatriate baseball players in the United States
Gwinnett Braves players
Indianapolis Indians players
Kansas City Royals players

Leones del Escogido players
Major League Baseball players from the Dominican Republic
Major League Baseball shortstops
Mexican League baseball second basemen
Mexican League baseball shortstops
Missoula Osprey players
Mobile BayBears players
Omaha Storm Chasers players
Pawtucket Red Sox players
Sportspeople from San Pedro de Macorís
Pittsburgh Pirates players
Reno Aces players
San Diego Padres players
Scottsdale Scorpions players
South Bend Silver Hawks players
Tigres de Quintana Roo players
Toros del Este players
Vaqueros Unión Laguna players
Visalia Oaks players
Dominican Republic expatriate baseball players in Nicaragua